The 35th United States Colored Infantry was an infantry regiment that served in the Union Army during the American Civil War. The regiment was composed of African American enlisted men commanded by white officers and was authorized by the Bureau of Colored Troops which was created by the United States War Department on May 22, 1863.

Service
The 35th U.S. Colored Infantry was organized February 8, 1864 from the 1st North Carolina Colored Infantry for three-year service under the command of Colonel James C. Beecher.

The regiment was attached to Montgomery's Brigade, District of Florida, Department of the South, February 1864. 2nd Brigade, Vogdes' Division, District of Florida, Department of the South, to April 1864. District of Florida, Department of the South, to October 1864. 4th Separate Brigade, Department of the South, to November 1864. 2nd Brigade, Coast Division, Department of the South, to December 1864. 4th Separate Brigade, Department of the South, to March 1865. 1st Separate Brigade, Department of the South, to August 1865. Department of the South, to June 1866.

The 35th U.S. Colored Infantry mustered out of service June 1, 1866.

Detailed service
Expedition to Lake City, Fla., February 14–22, 1864. Battle of Olustee February 20. Duty at Jacksonville, Fla., until November. Operations on St. Johns River May 19–27. Horse Head Landing May 23. (Four companies detached on Expedition to James Island, S.C., July 1–10. King's Creek, S.C., July 3.) Raid from Jacksonville upon Baldwin July 23–28. South Fork, Black Creek, July 24. Black Creek near Whitesides July 27. Raid on Florida Railroad August 15–19. Ordered from Jacksonville to Hilton Head, S.C., November 25, Expedition to Boyd's Neck November 28–30. Battle of Honey Hill November 30. Return to Jacksonville, Fla., and duty there until March 1865. Ordered to Charleston, S.C. Duty there and at various points in the Department of the South until June 1866.

Casualties
The regiment lost a total of 205 men during service; 4 officers and 49 enlisted men killed or mortally wounded, 1 officer and 151 enlisted men died of disease.

Commanders
 Colonel James C. Beecher
 Lieutenant Colonel William Reed - commanded at the Battle of Olustee where he was mortally wounded
 Major Archibald Bogle - commanded after Ltc Reed was mortally wounded in action at the Battle of Olustee

See also

 List of United States Colored Troops Civil War Units
 United States Colored Troops

References
 Dyer, Frederick H. A Compendium of the War of the Rebellion (Des Moines, IA: Dyer Pub. Co.), 1908.
 Reid, Richard M. Freedom for Themselves: North Carolina's Black Soldiers in the Civil War Era (Chapel Hill, NC: University of North Carolina Press), 2008. 
 Singleton, William Henry. Recollections of My Slavery Days (Raleigh, NC: Division of Archives and History, North Carolina Dept. of Cultural Resources), 1999. 
Attribution

United States Colored Troops Civil War units and formations
Military units and formations established in 1864
Military units and formations disestablished in 1866